Dylan Pietsch (born 23 April 1998) is an Australian rugby sevens player. Pietsch was a member of the Australian men's rugby seven's squad at the Tokyo 2020 Olympics. The team came third in their pool round and then lost to Fiji 19-nil in the quarterfinal.

References

External links
 

1998 births
Living people
Male rugby sevens players
Olympic rugby sevens players of Australia
Rugby sevens players at the 2020 Summer Olympics
Australian rugby union players
Rugby union wings
New South Wales Waratahs players
Place of birth missing (living people)